The house at 175 Belden Street is a historic home located on City Island in the Bronx in New York City.  It was built about 1880 and is a simple, small picturesque cottage with an asymmetrical cruciform plan.

It was listed as a New York City Designated Landmark in 1981 and on the National Register of Historic Places in 1982.

References

Houses on the National Register of Historic Places in the Bronx
Houses completed in 1880
Houses in the Bronx
City Island, Bronx
New York City Designated Landmarks in the Bronx